Yvonne Graham (née Grabner, formerly Mai; born 22 August 1965) is a retired female middle distance runner who specialized in the 1500 metres. She represented East Germany and later Germany, before attaining Jamaican citizenship in 1993. She won a bronze medal at the 1989 IAAF World Indoor Championships.

Career
Graham was born in Annaberg-Buchholz, Bezirk Karl-Marx-Stadt. Under her maiden name of Yvonne Grabner, she first came to prominence in 1983 competing for East Germany, winning a bronze medal at the 1983 European Junior Championships. Later, she married fellow East German athlete, Volker Mai. While competing as Yvonne Mai, she won a bronze medal at the 1989 World Indoor Championships. She competed for East Germany until 1990 and then a United Germany. In 1993 she married Jamaican 400 m hurdler Winthrop Graham and obtained Jamaican citizenship.  She holds the Jamaican national records for 1500 metres, mile, and 3000 metres.

Achievements

Personal bests
1500 metres - 4:01.84 min (1995)
One mile - 4:22.97 min (1990)
3000 metres - 8:37.07 min (1995)
5000 metres - 15:07.91 min (1995)
800 metres - 1:58.32 (1990)

References

1965 births
Living people
People from Annaberg-Buchholz
People from Bezirk Karl-Marx-Stadt
East German female middle-distance runners
German female middle-distance runners
Sportspeople from Saxony
Jamaican female middle-distance runners
World Athletics Championships athletes for Jamaica
World Athletics Championships athletes for Germany
World Athletics Indoor Championships medalists